Writing-on-Stone Provincial Park is located about  southeast of Lethbridge, Alberta, Canada, or  east of the community of Milk River, and straddles the Milk River itself. It is one of the largest areas of protected prairie in the Alberta park system, and serves as both a nature preserve and protection for many First Nations (indigenous) rock carvings and paintings. The park is sacred to the Blackfoot and many other aboriginal tribes.

On July 6, 2019, Writing-on-Stone / Áísínai’pi was inscribed as a UNESCO World Heritage Site. Its UNESCO application was filed under the name Áísínaiʼpi, a Blackfoot language word meaning "it is pictured / written". The provincial park is synonymous with the  Áísínaiʼpi National Historic Site.

Resources
Writing-on-Stone Park contains the greatest concentration of rock art on the North American Great Plains. There are over 50 petroglyph sites and thousands of works. The park also showcases a North-West Mounted Police (NWMP) outpost reconstructed on its original site. The original outpost was burned down by persons unknown after it was closed in 1918.

The park features a visitor centre, campgrounds, picnic areas, group-use areas, and hiking trails, as well as canoeing and kayaking on the Milk River.

Flora and fauna 

The park comprises  of coulee and prairie habitat, and is home to a diverse variety of plants and animals.

Bird species include prairie falcons, great horned owls, short-eared owls, American kestrels, and cliff swallows, as well as introduced ring-necked pheasants and grey partridges.

The prairie surrounding the park is good habitat for pronghorn antelopes. Other animals found in the park area include mule deer, northern pocket gophers, skunks, raccoons, yellow-bellied marmots, and bobcats. Tiger salamanders, boreal chorus frogs, leopard frogs, and plains spadefoot toads represent the amphibians. Reptiles include garter snakes, bull snakes, and prairie rattlesnakes.

The coulee environment is optimal for balsam poplars and narrow leaf cottonwoods. There are also peachleaf willows and plains cottonwoods in the park. Shrubs include chokecherry, juniper, saskatoon, sandbar willow, and two varieties of wild rose. Some of the northernmost species of cactus, including Opuntia (prickly pear) and Pediocactus (pincushion), are found in the park as well.

Geologic setting

The sandstone outcrops in the park belong to the Milk River Formation, which was deposited along the edge of a large inland sea about 84 million years ago during the Late Cretaceous epoch. Meltwater from the retreating glaciers at the end of the last Ice Age carved the present Milk River valley, and water, ice and wind eroded the sandstone to produce the hoodoos and cliffs that are part of the park today.

History
There is evidence that the Milk River Valley was inhabited by First Nations people as long ago as 9000 years. First Nations tribes such as the Blackfoot probably created many of the rock carvings (petroglyphs) and paintings (pictographs). Other First Nations groups such as the Shoshone also travelled through the valley and may have also created some of the art. These carvings and paintings tell of the lives and journeys of those who created them, and of the spirits they found here. The towering cliffs and hoodoos had a powerful impact on the native visitors, who believed these were the homes of powerful spirits. The shelter of the coulees and the abundance of game and berries made the area that is now the park an excellent location for these nomadic people to stop on their seasonal migrations. While the greatest use of the area was made by those in transit, there is some evidence, including tipi rings and a medicine wheel, that there was some permanent settlement here.

Beginning about 1730, large numbers of horses, metal goods, and guns began to appear on the western plains. This signified not only a change in the First Nations lifestyle, but a change in the content of the rock art. Pictures of hunters on horseback, and warriors without body shields began to be created.

In 1887 a North-West Mounted Police (the precursor to the Royal Canadian Mounted Police) camp was set up at Writing-on-Stone to attempt to curtail cross-border whisky smuggling, which was devastating the native population, and to put a stop to First Nations horse-raiding parties. But in fact neither problem ever became serious at this outpost, and the NWMP spent most of their time fighting summer grass fires, herding stray American cattle back across the border, and riding hundreds of uneventful kilometres on border patrol. In the period immediately preceding World War I, settlers began to arrive in the area, which helped to alleviate some of the boredom and isolation the NWMP officers faced. In 1918, the outpost was closed, as Canadian authorities felt little possibility of criminal activity along the border, and shortly thereafter, the outpost fell victim to arson by persons unknown.

The park was created in 1957 and was designated an archaeological preserve in 1977. As part of the NWMP centennial celebrations, the outpost was reconstructed between 1973 and 1975, and is now one of the attractions in the park. Archaeologists from the Alberta Provincial Parks Department surveyed and catalogued numerous petroglyph and pictograph sites within the park in 1973. In 1981, a portion of the park was named a Provincial Historic Resource to protect this rock art from increasing impact from vandalism and graffiti. The most sensitive areas are now set aside in areas designated for guided tours only. In 1977, the park preserved the archaeology of the pictographs and petroglyphs. This protection makes the park one of the largest concentrations of rock art in the North American Plains. In 2004 Parks Canada added the park to Canada's tentative list of possible world heritage sites.  The application indicated that the Blackfoot people would also like the Sweet Grass Hills of Montana included as part of the world heritage site.  In March 2005, the park was designated a National Historic Site. On June 20, 2007, the park's new visitor centre, with views of the valley from the north rim, was officially opened.

See also
List of Alberta provincial parks
List of Canadian provincial parks
List of National Parks of Canada

References

Further reading
Bouchet-Bert, Lus.  "From Spiritual and Biographic to Boundary-Marking Deterrent Art: A Reinterpretation of Writing-on-Stone".  Plains Anthropologist 44.167 (1999): 27-46.

External links
Alberta: How the West was Young - Archaeology and Pre-contact - Writing-on-Stone
Elders' Voices - Writing-on-Stone

Provincial parks of Alberta
Rock art in North America
County of Warner No. 5
National Historic Sites in Alberta
Provincial Historic Resources of Alberta
Blackfoot culture
North-West Mounted Police forts
Protected areas established in 1957
Aboriginal National Historic Sites of Canada
Petroglyphs in Canada
1957 establishments in Alberta
World Heritage Sites in Canada
First Nations culture in Alberta